Mabel's Blunder (1914) is a silent comedy film directed by, written by, and starring Mabel Normand, the most successful of the early silent screen comediennes.

Plot
Mabel's Blunder tells the tale of a young woman who is secretly engaged to the boss's son.
The young man's sister comes to visit at their office, and a jealous Mabel, not knowing who the visiting woman is, dresses up as a (male) chauffeur to spy on them.

Production background
Produced at Mack Sennett's Keystone Studios, known at the time as "The Fun Factory", Mabel's Blunder showcases Normand's spontaneous and intuitive playfulness and her ability to be both romantically appealing and boisterously funny.

National Film Registry
This film, with its unusual gender-bending aspect, was added to the National Film Registry by the Library of Congress in December 2009 for being "culturally, historically or aesthetically" significant.

See also
A Florida Enchantment (1914) cross-dressing comedy directed by and written by Sidney Drew

References

External links
Mabel’s Blunder essay  by Brent E. Walker on the National Film Registry website 

Madcap Mabel: Mabel Normand website
Mabel Normand Lives Here website§
Mabel’s Blunder essay by Daniel Eagan In America's Film Legacy, 2009-2010: A Viewer's Guide To The 50 Landmark Movies Added To The National Film Registry In 2009-10, Bloomsbury Publishing USA, 2011,  Pages 14–17 

1914 films
1914 short films
Keystone Studios films
Films directed by Mabel Normand
American silent short films
1914 comedy films
American black-and-white films
Cross-dressing in American films
United States National Film Registry films
Silent American comedy films
American comedy short films
1910s English-language films
1910s American films